California has 21 major professional sports franchises, far more than any other US state. The San Francisco Bay Area has six major league teams spread amongst three cities: San Francisco, Oakland and San Jose. The Greater Los Angeles Area has ten major league teams. San Diego and Sacramento each have one major league team. 

California is home to some of most successful collegiate sports teams in the country. Among the list of NCAA schools with the most NCAA Division I championships the Stanford Cardinal, UCLA Bruins, USC Trojans and Cal Berkeley Golden Bears rank #1, #2, #3 and #10 on the list by teams with the most titles, and #1, #4, #2, and #7 by most individual titles, respectively.

It is the only U.S. state to have hosted both the Summer and Winter Olympics. Los Angeles hosted the 1932 and 1984 summer games, and will host the 2028 Summer Olympics. The 1960 Winter Olympics was held at the Squaw Valley Ski Resort in the Lake Tahoe region.

Top tier professional sports teams

Major League Baseball
Los Angeles Angels (1961) – based in Anaheim
Los Angeles Dodgers (1958)
Oakland Athletics (1968)
San Diego Padres (1969)
San Francisco Giants (1958)
National Basketball Association
Golden State Warriors (1962) – based in San Francisco
Los Angeles Clippers (1984)
Los Angeles Lakers (1960)
Sacramento Kings (1985)
National Football League
Los Angeles Chargers (1960) – plays in Inglewood; headquarters in Costa Mesa
Los Angeles Rams (1946) – plays in Inglewood; headquarters in Agoura Hills
San Francisco 49ers (1946) – plays in Santa Clara; headquarters also in Santa Clara
National Hockey League
Anaheim Ducks (1993)
Los Angeles Kings (1967)
San Jose Sharks (1991)
Major League Soccer
LA Galaxy (1996) – based in Carson
Los Angeles FC (2018)
San Jose Earthquakes (1996)
Women's National Basketball Association
Los Angeles Sparks (1997)
 National Women's Soccer League
 Angel City FC (2022) – based in Los Angeles
 San Diego Wave FC (2022)

Pro Football
California has produced the most Super Bowl winning Head Coaches in the history of the NFL, whether born or raised in the state (at least having attended High School in CA). Collecively, California Head Coaches have accounted for 17 Super Bowl wins.
Great State 
In chronological order of first Super Bowl win: John Madden (Jefferson HS, Daly City), Tom Flores (Sanger; Sanger Union HS), Bill Walsh (Los Angeles; Hayward HS, Hayward), Joe Gibbs (Santa Fe HS, Santa Fe Springs), George Seifert (San Francisco; San Francisco Poly HS), Mike Holmgren (San Francisco; Abraham Lincoln HS), Dick Vermeil (Calistoga; Calistoga HS), Brian Billick (Redlands HS, Redlands), Sean Payton (San Mateo), Pete Carroll (San Francisco; Redwood HS, Larkspur), Andy Reid (Los Angeles; John Marshall HS).

College sports

Home to some of most prominent universities in the United States, California has long had many respected collegiate sports programs, in particular the University of Southern California, University of California, Berkeley, UCLA, Stanford University, all of which are members of the Pac-12 Conference. They are often nationally ranked in the various sports and dominate media coverage of college sports in the state.  In addition, those Universities boast the highest academic standards (on average) of all major college (NCAA Division I) programs.  All 4 schools are ranked, academically, in the top 30 nationally with either Cal or UCLA ranked as the #1 public university in the country (usually #20 overall) and Stanford as the highest academically ranked Division 1A university in the country (usually #5 overall).

California is also home to the oldest college bowl game, the annual Rose Bowl (Pasadena), as well as the National Funding Holiday Bowl (San Diego) and San Francisco Bowl. A second San Diego game, the San Diego County Credit Union Poinsettia Bowl, was discontinued after the 2016 season.

According to the list of American universities with Olympic medalist students and alumni the top 4 universities on the list are, #1 USC Trojans (326), #2 Stanford Cardinal (302), #3 UCLA Bruins (270), and #4 Cal Berkeley Golden Bears (223). Also on the list of top 50 universities are, #27 Long Beach State Beach (47) and #38 UC Irvine Anteaters (33). Referencing a differing source, OlympStats (as of 2017), the all-time total number of Olympic athletes from California universities (1668) was nearly triple the amount from the next state, New York (559). The medal count was even more impressive, with California (678) accounting for more than 4 times the Gold medal count than the next state, Texas (157).

The Great Heisman State

California has produced the most Heisman Trophy winners.  Fifteen winners were born in and played high school football in the Golden State.  Additionally, Mater Dei High School has produced 3 Heisman winners; more than any other high school in the country.  

Seven Of these winners played collegiately at USC and one each at UCLA, Stanford, Army, Texas, Colorado, Notre Dame, Miami, and Alabama

NCAA Division I members 
The following California universities are members of NCAA Division I, or are upgrading from Division II to Division I (highlighted in green):

International sports events
California has hosted the Olympic Games three times. Los Angeles, the largest city in the state, hosted both the 1932 and 1984 Summer Olympics. Squaw Valley, California hosted the 1960 Winter Olympics. Los Angeles and San Francisco were in the race for the United States Olympic Committee nomination to host the 2016 Summer Olympics, but eventually lost to Chicago. Los Angeles will host the Olympic Games for a third time in 2028.

Besides the Olympics, California has also hosted several major international soccer events:
 Two of the venues for the 1994 FIFA World Cup were in the state—Stanford Stadium at Stanford University, with San Francisco serving as the official host city, and the Rose Bowl in Pasadena, with Los Angeles as the host city. The Rose Bowl hosted the final, won by Brazil in a penalty shootout with Italy.
 Both stadiums were also used for the 1999 FIFA Women's World Cup, along with Spartan Stadium (now CEFCU Stadium) in San Jose. The Rose Bowl again hosted the final, in which a crowd of over 90,000—the largest to witness a women's sporting event for more than 20 years—saw the USA defeat China in another penalty shootout, capped off by Brandi Chastain's famous shirt-stripping moment.
 The 2003 FIFA Women's World Cup used one California venue, The Home Depot Center (now Dignity Health Sports Park) in Carson. It hosted the final of that competition, won by Germany over Sweden.
 The Rose Bowl and Levi's Stadium in Santa Clara hosted matches in the Copa América Centenario, which celebrated the 100th anniversary of South America's international competition and was hosted by the U.S. in 2016.
 During the 2026 FIFA World Cup, SoFi Stadium and Levi's Stadium will host matches, making California one of two US states to have two venues hosting matches during the tournament; the other state being Texas. 

San Diego will host the 2023 World Lacrosse Championship in men's field lacrosse, with San Diego State's Snapdragon Stadium as the main venue and the University of San Diego's Torero Stadium, plus various fields at both universities, also hosting matches.

Local sports
Most city municipals house a variety of sports activities.  The available sports are typically listed on their city websites.  Additionally, there are a variety of California Sports activities listed on FindSportsNow's California database.

Motorsports

California has also long been a hub for motorsports and auto racing. The city of Long Beach, as part of the IndyCar Series, hosts the Long Beach Grand Prix every year in the month of April. The race that take place in the streets of downtown Long Beach is the longest running major street race held in North America. Long Beach has hosted Formula One events there in the past, and also currently hosts an event on the United SportsCar Championship schedule. 

Auto Club Speedway is a speedway in Fontana and currently hosts one NASCAR Cup Series race along with the 2nd-tier Xfinity Series a year. Sonoma Raceway is a multi-purpose facility outside Sonoma, featuring a road course and a drag strip. Different versions of the road course are home to a NASCAR event and an IndyCar event. The drag strip hosts a yearly NHRA event. Mazda Raceway Laguna Seca is a road course near Monterey that currently hosts an ALMS event, a round of the Rolex Sports Car Series and the Rolex Monterey Motorsports Reunion. The Auto Club Raceway at Pomona has hosted NHRA drag racing for over 50 years.

The NASCAR Cup Series holds two races in California, one each at Auto Club Speedway in Fontana (originally named the California Speedway) and at the Sonoma Raceway, formerly Sears Point Raceway. The IndyCar Series competes every April in the Toyota Grand Prix of Long Beach, through the streets of downtown Long Beach. IndyCar also holds an event at Sonoma in the summer. The NHRA Drag Racing Series holds three national events in California, as well; two at Auto Club Raceway at Pomona (formerly Pomona Raceway) and at the aforementioned Sonoma Raceway.

Notable off-road courses include Lake Elsinore Motorsports Park, Glen Helen Raceway and Prairie City State Park. Also, the AMA Supercross Series holds several events in stadiums at Californian cities such as Anaheim, Oakland, and San Diego.

Golf

California has several notable golf courses, like Cypress Point Club, Olympic Club, Pebble Beach Golf Links, Riviera Country Club – Pacific Palisades, California and Torrey Pines Golf Course. Notable tournaments include the AT&T Pebble Beach Pro-Am, Northern Trust Open, Farmers Insurance Open.

Notable Californian golfers include Tiger Woods, Phil Mickelson, Johnny Miller, Gene Littler, Collin Morikawa, Amy Alcott, Paula Creamer, and Juli Inkster.

Horse racing
Horse racing is regulated by the California Horse Racing Board. Notable racetracks include Santa Anita Park, Del Mar Fairgrounds, Los Alamitos, Golden Gate Fields and Pleasanton Fairgrounds. Notable races include the Santa Anita Derby, Santa Anita Handicap, Pacific Classic Stakes and Champion of Champions.

Former racetracks include Bay Meadows and Hollywood Park.

Mixed Martial Arts
California is widely regarded as the "mecca of MMA" for being the birthplace of the UFC (Ultimate Fighting Championship), Strikeforce MMA, the WEC (World Extreme Cagefighting), among other prominent MMA promotion orgs, and also for the quality and quantity of MMA fighters born or bred there. Bruce Lee, a California native, is considered one of the pioneering figures in the development of MMA.  

Not only is California a hotbed for producing native-born MMA fighters, but it also draws many elite athletes from around the world with level of training/gyms. California is home to many of the most successful and historic professional MMA gyms: AKA, Alliance MMA, Team Alpha Male, Black House (MMA), Kings MMA, Lion's Den (original), RVCA Training Center, Skrap Pack-Cesar Gracie Fight Team). 

Countless of Champions in the sport of MMA are California born or bred, or have their fight training in California.

Skateboarding
Skateboarding is a sport heavily associated with California as it is the place where the sport started. Professional skateboarder Tony Hawk was born in Carlsbad, California in 1968 and was involved in many bowl riding and vert competitions there.

Others
The California State Games, a statewide Olympics-like sport event, take place in California every year. The United States Olympic Committee governs this event.

Northern California – Southern California rivalry

Most of the teams from Northern California and Southern California are involved in intrastate rivalries. There are particularly strong rivalries between the Bay Area and Los Angeles teams.

Stadiums and arenas
Future venues in italics.

See also
 Sports in Los Angeles
 Sports in Sacramento, California
 Sports in San Diego
 Sports in the San Francisco Bay Area
 Professional sports in the Western United States
 Surfing in the United States

References

External links